The 2021–22 Norwich City F.C. season was the club's 120th season in existence and the first season back in the Premier League. In addition to the domestic league, Norwich City also participated in this season's editions of the FA Cup and the EFL Cup.

BK8 Sports shirt sponsorship 
On 7 June 2021, Norwich City announced that they had terminated the shirt sponsorship with existing sponsor Dafabet and signed a new club record deal with betting firm BK8 Sports. Within hours of the announcement pressure from fans forced BK8 Sports to remove adult content from their social media accounts.  Continued pressure from fans and fans groups led to the club and the betting firm cancelling the deal by mutual consent on 10 June. On 25 June the club announced Lotus Cars as their front of shirt sponsor for the 2021–22 Premier League season. JD Sports followed as shirt sleeve sponsor on 9 July.

Transfers

Transfers in

Loans in

Loans out

Transfers out

Pre-season friendlies 
Norwich City confirmed friendlies against King's Lynn Town, Lincoln City, Huddersfield Town, Coventry City Sheffield United, Gillingham and Newcastle United as part of the club's pre-season preparations.

Competitions

Overview

Premier League

League table

Results summary

Results by matchday

Matches 
The league fixtures were confirmed on 16 June 2021.

FA Cup

Norwich were drawn away to Charlton Athletic in the third round.

EFL Cup

Norwich entered the competition in the second round and were drawn at home against Bournemouth and Liverpool in the third round.

Statistics

Appearances, goals and cards

Goalscorers

See also
 2021–22 in English football
 List of Norwich City F.C. seasons

References 

Norwich City F.C. seasons
Norwich